Dâmburile may refer to several places in Romania:

 Dâmburile, a village in Suatu Commune, Cluj County
 Dâmburile, a village in Găvănești Commune, Olt County